Atomic engineering may be considered a superset of nuclear engineering, which is the branch of engineering that seeks "to harness the energy released from nuclear reactions" via "the application of nuclear energy in a variety of settings, including nuclear power plants, submarine propulsion systems, medical diagnostic equipment such as MRI machines, food production, nuclear weapons and radioactive-waste disposal facilities."

Origin 
The term "Atomic engineering" appears to have been first used in 1946 by Theodore von Kármán: "And now it seems we are at the threshold of the new atomic age. I do not know whether or not this is true, but certainly, we shall have 'atomic engineering' in the fields of power and transportation. Are we prepared for the problems involved?"Atomic engineering may be a superset of nuclear engineering, due to the historical usage of terms like Atoms for Peace , International Atomic Energy Agency, 'atomic engineer', etc..
An inclusive definition is: "exploiting the atomic characters of matter for engineering applications." For example, an atomic clock and potential applications of ultra-cold atom belong to atomic engineering. The atomic character could be the atomic spin (e.g. in Nuclear magnetic resonance and quantum computing applications), atomic position (e.g. Optical lattice), atomic mass (e.g. atomic power), etc.

The creation of the atomic bomb by Julius Robert Oppenheimer, the "Father of the atomic bomb", is based on atomic engineering. Oppenheimer was a university professor and physicist at the University of California, Berkeley.

Richard Feynman, in his famous 1959 lecture "There's Plenty of Room at the Bottom" on the trend of miniaturization, envisioned:

 "But I am not afraid to consider the final question as to whether, ultimately – in the great future – we can arrange the atoms the way we want; the very atoms, all the way down! What would happen if we could arrange the atoms one by one the way we want them. … When we get to the very, very, small world – say circuits of seven atoms – we have a lot of new things that would happen that represent completely new opportunities for design. Atoms on a small scale behave like nothing on a large scale, for they satisfy the laws of quantum mechanics. So, as we go down and fiddle around with the atoms down there, we are working with different laws, and we can expect to do different things. We can manufacture in different ways. We can use, not just circuits, but some system involving the quantized energy levels, or the interactions of quantized spins, etc."

Most practices of nanotechnology and materials science today have foci distinct from Feynman's ultimate vision of manipulating individual atomic position and spin, which may be better described by "Atomic engineering", that addresses characteristic length scales from 1 femtometer (the atomic nucleus size) to 1 nanometer (about 5 atoms across in linear dimension).  Coherent quantum control of individual atomic defect like the Nitrogen-vacancy center, and the eventual "3D atom printing" ("2D atom printing" was realized in 1990 by IBM using a scanning tunneling microscope), fit Feynman's ultimate vision.

References

Nuclear technology
Engineering disciplines